David E. Oks is an American writer and political activist, best known for organizing and managing the Mike Gravel 2020 presidential campaign as a high school senior. Since 2020, Oks has been involved with the Gravel Institute, a progressive political advocacy group founded by Mike Gravel after the end of his 2020 presidential campaign.

Early life and education 
Oks was born to a family of Jewish immigrants from Argentine, who have been described as "socialist" in regards to his views.

Oks attended the Masters School, where he was a student when he convinced former Senator Mike Gravel to enter the 2020 Democratic presidential primaries. 

He enrolled in Pembroke College at the University of Oxford in the fall of 2019.

Campaign work 
Oks previously ran an unsuccessful write-in campaign for mayor of Ardsley, New York in 2017. His campaign for mayor was notable for his young age, which received attention in The New York Times and on WNYC. He garnered 50 votes, or approximately 3% of the vote, in the election.

Mike Gravel 2020 presidential campaign 
Oks contacted Gravel on March 14, 2019, to propose a campaign in the 2020 Democratic presidential primaries. The stated goal was not to win the primaries but to reach the Democratic debate stage. Gravel was hesitant at first, but Oks and school friend Henry Williams convinced Gravel to launch a campaign in order to promote their left-wing political views.

According to Oks, he first learned about Gravel from Nixonland by Rick Perlstein, but was also encouraged by Felix Biederman's praise of Gravel on Chapo Trap House.

Shortly after the campaign unofficially launched on March 20, 2019, Oks claimed authorship of posts that attracted much attention on Twitter.

Along with Williams, Oks was the subject of a June 9, 2019 profile in The New York Times Magazine.

After Gravel's campaign ended on August 6, 2019, Oks said that his goal with the campaign was "to push for a new sort of politics" and "to talk about issues we thought no other candidate was talking about."

Subsequent work 
According to The American Prospect, Oks has been involved with the creation of the Gravel Institute, a 501(c)4 advocacy group that promotes progressive causes and ideas through YouTube videos.

References 

Living people
American campaign managers
Mike Gravel
2001 births
Candidates in the 2017 United States elections
Alumni of Pembroke College, Oxford